Iris Barbura (born November 4, 1912 in Arad, Romania; d. June 13, 1969 in Ithaca, New York) was a Romanian-German-American dancer, choreographer, and dance teacher.

Life and Work 
Barbura began her dance studies in 1931 in Bucharest at the National University of Music Bucharest. In 1935 she met pianist (and later conductor) Sergiu Celibidache. They had a multi-year romantic and artistic partnership. Celebidache accompanied Barbura on the piano, and also composed music that she used in her performances. From 1936 to 1938, Barbura spent summers studying dance in Vienna, Dresden, at the Mozarteum in Salzburg with Harald Kreutzberg, and in Berlin.

From 1938 to 1942 Barbura worked in Bucharest as a choreographer and performed solo programs.  She practiced modern dance and was the first choreographer at the National Theatre.  In 1942 she embarked on an international performance tour to Germany. From 1945 to 1951, she lived with Celebidache in Berlin and gave solo dance recitals. Vergiu Cornea was a sometime dance partner. She and Celibidache separated in 1951, and she emigrated to the US, where she lived in Ithaca, New York. There she opened her own dance studio at 420 Eddy St. In June 1969, she leapt to her death from a bridge over Triphammer Falls.

In 2016, her most famous student Beth Soll performed a solo work in her honor.

In 2017, she was the subject of the biography Iris Barbura: Don't Think — Dance, Dance, Dance! by Alexandru Musat.

References 
 Agnes Kern et al.: Tribute to Iris Barbura. Hrsg. vom Centrul National al Dansului Bucuresti und vom Deutsches Tanzarchiv Köln. Berlin 2017. .
 Alexandru Musat: Iris Barbura. Don't think - dance, dance, dance. Published by Deutschen Tanzarchiv Köln. Bucharest, Enciclopedica Publishing House 2017. .

External links 
 Beth Soll - Tribute to Iris Barbura Beth Soll – Tribute to Iris Barbura.
  Camaro Stiftung Berlin – Tribute to Iris Barbura.
 Radio Romania International - Choreographin Iris Barbura: Die wahre und pure Kunst des Ausdruckstanzes Luana Plesea, Ana Nedelea: Choreographin Iris Barbura: Die wahre und pure Kunst des Ausdruckstanzes.
 Tribute to Iris Barbura Beth Soll / Iris Barbura

References 

National University of Music Bucharest alumni
1912 births
1969 suicides
People from Arad, Romania
Romanian female dancers
Romanian choreographers
German female dancers
German choreographers
American female dancers
20th-century American dancers
American choreographers
Suicides in New York (state)
People from Ithaca, New York
Romanian emigrants to Germany
German emigrants to the United States
20th-century German dancers
Suicides by jumping in the United States
1969 deaths
20th-century American women
20th-century German women